This article contains information about the literary events and publications of 1651.

Events
August 22 – Execution on Tower Hill in London of Welsh Protestant preacher Christopher Love

New books

Prose
Noah Biggs – Chymiatrophilos, Matæotechnia medicinæ praxeōs, The vanity of the Craft of Physick, or, A new dispensator
William Bosworth – The Chaste and Lost Lovers
Roger Boyle, 1st Earl of Orrery – Parthenissa (first section)
Mary Cary (Rande) – The Little Horn's Doom and Downfall and A New and More Exact Map of the New Jerusalem's Glory
Marin le Roy de Gomberville – Jeune Alcidiane
Francisco de Quevedo – Virtud militante contra las cuatro pestes del mundo y cuatro fantasmas de la vida
Baltasar Gracián – El Criticón (first part)
Thomas Hobbes – Leviathan, or The Matter, Forme and Power of a Common Wealth Ecclesiasticall and Civil
John Milton – Defensio pro Populo Anglicano
Paul Scarron – Roman comique (Comic romance, first part)
Filip Stanislavov – Abagar (first printed book in modern Bulgarian)
Anna Weamys – A Continuation of Sir Philip Sydney's Arcadia
Sir Henry Wotton (posthumous) – Reliquiæ Wottonianæ; or, a collection of lives, letters, poems; with characters of sundry personages: and other incomparable pieces of language and art "By the curious pensil of the ever memorable Sr Henry Wotton Kt, late, provost of Eton Colledg"

Drama
William Cartwright
The Lady Errant
The Ordinary
The Siege, or Love's Convert
Comedies, Tragi-Comedies, with Other Poems
Pedro Calderon de la Barca – El alcalde de Zalamea
Jerónimo de Cáncer – Obras varias
Francisco López de Zárate – Hercules furente y oeta
Juan de Matos Fragoso – La defensa de la Fè, y Principe prodigioso
Thomas Randolph (attributed to) – Hey for Honesty, Down with Knavery (adapted from Aristophanes' Plutus)
Jerónimo de Cáncer – Vejamen
Leonard Willan – Astraea, or True Love's Mirror (adapted from Honoré D'Urfé's L'Astrée)

Poetry
William Davenant – Gondibert (second impression)
Francisco de Borja y Aragón – Nápoles recuperada
Manuel de Salinas y Lizana – La casta Susana, paráfrasis poética de su sagrada historia
Francisco de Trillo y Figueroa – Neapolisea
Henry Vaughan – Olor Iscanus (Swan of Usk)

Births
April 6 – André Dacier, French classicist (died 1722)
August 6 – François Fénelon, French theologian (died 1715)
October 24 – Jean de La Chapelle, French dramatist (died 1723)
November 12 – Juana Inés de la Cruz (Sor Juana), Mexican poet (died 1695)

Deaths
January 29 – Diego de Colmenares, Spanish historian (born 1586)
February 14 – Jean Roberti, Flemish theologian (born 1569)
April – Elizabeth Richardson, 1st Lady Cramond, English women's writer (born c. 1576)
October 7 – Jacques Sirmond, French scholar (born 1559)
December 14 – Pierre Dupuy, French scholar (born 1582)
December 22 – Arnold Johan Messenius, Swedish royal historiographer (born 1607/1608)
Unknown dates
Adho Duraso, Rajasthani poet (born c. 1550)
Henry Rice, Welsh courtier and writer (born c. 1585)

References

 
Years of the 17th century in literature